Niya may refer to:
 Niya (Sanskrit, Hindu mythology) - another name for Lord Hanuman, a desire for something bigger, purpose, bright, sweet nectar.
 Niya (mythology), a Polish deity of the underworld
 Niya County or Minfeng County, Hotan Prefecture, Xinjiang, China
 Niya Town, the seat of Niya/Minfeng County in Hotan Prefecture, Xinjiang , China
 Niya ruins, an archaeological site in Minfeng County, Xinjiang, China
 Niya Kingdom, a kingdom in Mesopotamia

People with the surname
 Yab Niya (born 1994), Indian cricketer

People with the given name
 Niya Butts (born 1978), American women’s college basketball coach

See also